These are the results for the mixed teams event at the 2018 Summer Youth Olympics.

Groups

Results

Group A

Group B

Knockout stage

References 

 Schedule

External links
 Group Play Summary 
 Draw 

Badminton at the 2018 Summer Youth Olympics
Mixed badminton